Xantheremia is a genus of beetles in the family Buprestidae, containing the following species:

 Xantheremia brancsiki (Obenberger, 1935)
 Xantheremia chivensis (Volkovitsh, 1978)
 Xantheremia convoluta (Klug, 1829)
 Xantheremia fasciata (Roth, 1851)
 Xantheremia flavipennis (Klug, 1829)
 Xantheremia freidbergi Volkovitsh, 2004
 Xantheremia jelineki Bílý, 1983
 Xantheremia kaplini Volkovitsh, 1984
 Xantheremia koenigi (Ganglbauer, 1888)
 Xantheremia mazandaranica (Bílý, 1983)
 Xantheremia pantherina (Bílý, 1979)
 Xantheremia philistina (Marseul, 1866)
 Xantheremia steinbergi (Volkovitsh, 1978)
 Xantheremia straminea (Abeille de Perrin, 1895)
 Xantheremia volkovitshi Bílý, 1983

References

Buprestidae genera